Tani (written:  lit. "valley") is a Japanese surname. Notable people with the surname include:

, Japanese voice actor and actor
Daniel M. Tani (born 1961), American astronaut
, Japanese actor
, Japanese actress and voice actress
, Japanese child actress
, Japanese comedian, actor and musician
, Japanese sport wrestler
, Japanese politician
, Japanese actress
, Japanese idol, a member of SKE48 and a former member of HKT48
, Japanese judoka
, Japanese general
, Japanese baseball player
, Japanese martial arts instructor and professional challenge wrestler in England

Fictional characters
Akiko Tani, a character in the manga series Detective Conan
Chiaki Tani, a character in the Samurai Sentai Shinkenger

See also
Ōtani (surname)

Japanese-language surnames